HMS Gifford was one of 23 boats of the  of patrol boats built for the Royal Navy in the 1950s. Gifford was launched on 30 June 1954. In 1968 the vessel was sold to Nigeria and renamed NNS Bonny. Bonny took part in the Nigerian Civil War and was decommissioned in 1983. Bonny is preserved at the Nigerian War Museum in Umuahia.

Service history
Gifford was a  constructed for the Royal Navy. The names of the class ships were all chosen from villages ending in "-ford". This boat was named after Gifford. She was launched on 30 June 1954 and sold to Nigeria in 1968. Renamed NNS Bonny, she fought in the Nigerian Civil War against Biafra. She was decommissioned in 1983.

Museum ship 
NNS Bonny is preserved in the Nigerian War Museum at Umuahia as a museum exhibit.

Notes

References

Ford-class seaward defence boats
Royal Navy ship names
1954 ships
Bonny
Bonny
Patrol vessels of the Nigerian Navy
Museum ships